The 2016–17 OK Liga is the 48th season of the top-tier league of rink hockey in Spain. It started on 24 September 2016 and finished on 3 June 2017.

Teams

After the end of the previous season, Cerceda resigned to its spot in OK Liga, being Lloret Vila Esportiva spared from relegation.

Overview
On 7 May 2017, Barcelona Lassa achieved its 28th title, fourth consecutive, after earning a 4–4 draw in the round 27 at the rink of its historic rival Reus Deportiu La Fira.

League table

Results

Top scorers

Source:

Copa del Rey

The 2017 Copa del Rey was the 74th edition of the Spanish men's roller hockey cup. It was played in Alcobendas between the seven first qualified teams after the first half of the season and Reicomsa Alcobendas as host team.

Barcelona Lassa defended successfully its title and won its 21st cup.

Supercopa de España

The 2016 Supercopa de España was the 13th edition of the Spanish men's roller hockey cup. It was played in Reus.

Liceo achieved its first official title ever.

References

External links
Real Federación Española de Patinaje

OK Liga seasons
2017 in roller hockey
2016 in roller hockey
2017 in Spanish sport
2016 in Spanish sport